Orbix may refer to:
 Orbix (toy), a battery-operated puzzle toy from Milton Bradley released in 1995
 Orbix (software)